Drake is an unincorporated community in Warren County, Kentucky, United States. It was also known as Old Drake or Whites Chapel.

The community of Drake has less than 2,000 in population and resides in southern Warren County about 60 miles north of Nashville, Tennessee.

Drake Country Store was once the site of an old post office, but has since been closed and now only a restaurant.

References

Unincorporated communities in Warren County, Kentucky
Unincorporated communities in Kentucky